Pandanus purpurascens a species of plant in the family Pandanaceae. It is native to Réunion. Some sources list Pandanus madagascariensis as a synonym of the accepted name P. purpurascens, while other sources list Pandanus concretus as the accepted name for P. madagascariensis.

References

Flora of Réunion
purpurascens
Plants described in 1808